Lyophyllum is a genus of fungus in the Lyophyllaceae family. The genus is monotypic, containing the single species Lyophyllopsis keralensis, found in India.

References

Lyophyllaceae
Monotypic Agaricales genera
Fungi of India
Fungi described in 1981